Milan Nikolić (Serbian Cyrillic: Милан Никoлић, born June 21, 1987) is a Serbian football forward playing with Moravac Mrštane.

References

External links
 
 

1987 births
Living people
Footballers from Belgrade
Serbian footballers
Serbian expatriate footballers
Association football forwards
FK BSK Borča players
FK Čukarički players
FK Zemun players
Serbian expatriate sportspeople in Poland
Serbian expatriate sportspeople in Hungary
Expatriate footballers in Poland
Expatriate footballers in Hungary
Polonia Warsaw players
Nyíregyháza Spartacus FC players
Ekstraklasa players
Nemzeti Bajnokság II players